Laslea is a commune located in Sibiu County, Transylvania, Romania. It is composed of five villages: Florești (Felsendorf, Földszin), Laslea, Mălâncrav (Malmkrog, Almakerék), Nou Săsesc (Neudorf, Apaújfalu), and Roandola (Rauthal, Rudály). In Romanian, Florești was known as Felța until 1950.

Geography
The commune is situated towards the center of the Transylvanian Plateau. It is located in the northeastern part of Sibiu County, on the border with Mureș County. It lies on the banks of the river Laslea, which discharges into the Târnava Mare near the village Laslea.

National road  runs just north of the commune.

Demographics
At the 2011 census, Laslea had 3,327 inhabitants. Of those, 61% were Romanians, 30% Roma, 7.5% Germans, and 1% Hungarians. At the 2002 census, 76.2% were Romanian Orthodox, 7.2% Pentecostal, 5.7% Evangelical Lutheran, 5.2% Seventh-day Adventist, 2.6% Evangelical Church of Augustan Confession, and 1.2% Baptist.

Prince of Wales and sustainable tourism 
In 2006, the Prince of Wales bought and restored two 18th-century Saxon houses in the villages of Mălâncrav and Viscri to help protect the unique way of life that has existed for hundreds of years and promote sustainable tourism.

The buildings have been sensitively restored and converted into guesthouses for tourists. They remain in keeping with the surrounding architecture and feature a number of Transylvanian antiques but with modern facilities where possible.

The renovation of these buildings has helped provide a sustainable future for the people of rural Transylvania while also enabling residents to maintain their traditional way of life.

Mălâncrav church gallery

See also 
 Ghelința, St. Emeric Church: 13th-century murals
 Church on the Hill (Sighișoara), 14th-16th century murals
 Dârjiu, church murals from 1419

References 

Communes in Sibiu County
Localities in Transylvania
Malancrav
Malancrav